Finnish (endonym:   or  ) is a Uralic language of the Finnic branch, spoken by the majority of the population in Finland and by ethnic Finns outside of Finland. Finnish is one of the two official languages of Finland (the other being Swedish). In Sweden, both Finnish and Meänkieli (which has significant mutual intelligibility with Finnish) are official minority languages. The Kven language, which like Meänkieli is mutually intelligible with Finnish, is spoken in the Norwegian county Troms og Finnmark by a minority group of Finnish descent.

Finnish is typologically agglutinative and uses almost exclusively suffixal affixation. Nouns, adjectives, pronouns, numerals and verbs are inflected depending on their role in the sentence. Sentences are normally formed with subject–verb–object word order, although the extensive use of inflection allows them to be ordered differently. Word order variations are often reserved for differences in information structure. Finnish orthography uses a Latin-script alphabet derived from the Swedish alphabet, and is phonetic to a great extent. Vowel length and consonant length are distinguished, and there are a range of diphthongs, although vowel harmony limits which diphthongs are possible.

Classification
Finnish is a member of the Finnic group of the Uralic family of languages. The Finnic group also includes Estonian and a few minority languages spoken around the Baltic Sea and in Russia's Republic of Karelia.

Finnish demonstrates an affiliation with other Uralic languages (such as Hungarian) in several respects including:

Shared morphology:
case suffixes such as genitive , partitive  /  ( < Proto-Uralic *-ta, originally ablative), essive  /  ( < *-na, originally locative)
possessive suffixes such as 1st person singular  ( < Proto-Uralic *-n-mi), 2nd person singular  ( < Proto-Uralic *-ti).
various derivational suffixes (e.g. causative  < Proto-Uralic *-k-ta)
Shared basic vocabulary displaying regular sound correspondences with the other Uralic languages (e.g.  'fish' ~ North Saami  ~ Hungarian ; and  'disappear' ~ North Saami  ~ Hungarian  'leave (behind)'.

Several theories exist as to the geographic origin of Finnish and the other Uralic languages. The most widely held view is that they originated as a Proto-Uralic language somewhere in the boreal forest belt around the Ural Mountains region and/or the bend of the middle Volga. The strong case for Proto-Uralic is supported by common vocabulary with regularities in sound correspondences, as well as by the fact that the Uralic languages have many similarities in structure and grammar.

The Defense Language Institute in Monterey, California, United States, classifies Finnish as a level III language (of four levels) in terms of learning difficulty for native English speakers.

Geographic distribution

Finnish is spoken by about five million people, most of whom reside in Finland. There are also notable Finnish-speaking minorities in Sweden, Norway, Russia, Estonia, Brazil, Canada, and the United States. The majority of the population of Finland (90.37% )  speak Finnish as their first language. The remainder speak Swedish (5.42%), one of the Sámi languages (for example Northern, Inari, or Skolt), or another language as their first language. Finnish is spoken as a second language in Estonia by about 167,000 people. The varieties of Finnish found in Norway's Finnmark (namely Kven) and in northern Sweden (namely Meänkieli) have the status of official minority languages, and thus can be considered distinct languages from Finnish. However, since all three are mutually intelligible, one may alternatively view them as dialects of the same language.

There are also forms of Finnish spoken by diasporas in Siberia, by the Siberian Finns and in America, where American Finnish is spoken by Finnish Americans.

In the latest census, around 1000 people in Russia claimed to speak Finnish natively; however, a larger amount of 14,000 claimed to be able to speak Finnish in total.

Official status
Today, Finnish is one of two official languages of Finland (the other being Swedish), and has been an official language of the European Union since 1995. However, the Finnish language did not have an official status in the country during the period of Swedish rule, which ended in 1809. After the establishment of Grand Duchy of Finland, and against the backdrop of the Fennoman movement, the language obtained its official status in the Finnish Diet of 1863.

Finnish also enjoys the status of an official minority language in Sweden. Under the Nordic Language Convention, citizens of the Nordic countries speaking Finnish have the opportunity to use their native language when interacting with official bodies in other Nordic countries without being liable to any interpretation or translation costs. However, concerns have been expressed about the future status of Finnish in Sweden, for example, where reports produced for the Swedish government during 2017 show that minority language policies are not being respected, particularly for the 7% of Finns settled in the country.

History

Prehistory
The Uralic family of languages, of which Finnish is a member, are hypothesized to derive from a single ancestor language termed Proto-Uralic, spoken sometime between 8,000 and 2,000 BCE (estimates vary) in the vicinity of the Ural mountains. Over time, Proto-Uralic split into various daughter languages, which themselves continued to change and diverge, yielding yet more descendants. One of these descendants is the reconstructed  Proto-Finnic, from which the Finnic languages developed, and which diverged from Proto-Samic (a reconstructed ancestor of the Sámi languages) around 1500–1000 BCE.

Current models assume that three or more Proto-Finnic dialects evolved during the first millennium BCE. These dialects were defined geographically, and were distinguished from one another along a north–south split as well as an east–west split. The northern dialects of Proto-Finnic, from which Finnish developed, lacked the mid vowel . This vowel was found only in the southern dialects, which developed into Estonian, Livonian, and Votian. The northern variants used third person singular pronoun  instead of southern  (Est. ). While the eastern dialects of Proto-Finnic (which developed in the modern-day eastern Finnish dialects, Veps, Karelian, and Ingrian) formed genitive plural nouns via plural stems (e.g., eastern Finnish  < *kaloi-ten), the western dialects of Proto-Finnic (today's Estonian, Livonian and western Finnish varieties) used the non-plural stems (e.g., Est.  < *kala-ten). Another defining characteristic of the east–west split was the use of the reflexive suffix , used only in the eastern dialects.

Medieval period 

The birch bark letter 292 from the early 13th century is the first known document in any Finnic language. The first known written example of Finnish itself is found in a German travel journal dating back to c.1450:  (Modern Finnish: "" English: "I want to speak Finnish, [but] I am not able to"). According to the travel journal, the words are those of a Finnish bishop whose name is unknown. At the time, most priests in Finland were Swedish-speaking.

During the Middle Ages, when Finland was under Swedish rule, Finnish was only spoken. At the time, the language of international commerce was Middle Low German, the language of administration Swedish, and religious ceremonies were held in Latin. This meant that Finnish speakers could use their mother tongue only in everyday life. Finnish was considered inferior to Swedish, and Finnish speakers were second-class members of society because they could not use their language in any official situations. There were even efforts to reduce the use of Finnish through parish clerk schools, the use of Swedish in church, and by having Swedish-speaking servants and maids move to Finnish-speaking areas.

Writing system

The first comprehensive writing system for Finnish was created by Mikael Agricola, a Finnish bishop, in the 16th century. He based his writing system on the western dialects. Agricola's ultimate plan was to translate the Bible, but first he had to develop an orthography for the language, which he based on Swedish, German, and Latin. The Finnish standard language still relies on his innovations with regard to spelling, though Agricola used less systematic spelling than is used today.

Though Agricola's intention was that each phoneme (and allophone under qualitative consonant gradation) should correspond to one letter, he failed to achieve this goal in various respects. For example, k, c, and q were all used for the phoneme . Likewise, he alternated between dh and d to represent the allophonic voiced dental fricative  (like th in English this), between dh and z to represent the geminate voiceless dental fricative  (like th in thin, but longer in duration), and between gh and g to represent the allophonic voiced velar fricative . Agricola did not consistently represent vowel length in his orthography.

Others revised Agricola's work later, striving for a more systematic writing system. Along the way, Finnish lost several fricative consonants in a process of sound change. The sounds  and  disappeared from the language, surviving only in a small rural region in Western Finland. In the standard language, however, the effect of the lost sounds is thus:
 became . The sound  was written ⟨d⟩ or ⟨dh⟩ by Agricola. However, Agricola's spelling ⟨d⟩ prevailed, and the pronunciation in Standard Finnish became  through spelling pronunciation.
 became . These interdental fricatives were written as ⟨tz⟩ (for both grades: geminate and short) in some of the earliest written records. Though these developed into a variety of other sounds depending on dialect (or ), the standard language has arrived at spelling pronunciation  (which is treated as a consonant cluster and hence not subject to consonant gradation).
 became:
'kin, family' :  [genitive form] from earlier *suku : *suɣun, and  :  'ability, skill' [nominative and genitive, respectively] from *kükü : *küɣün, contrasting with  :  'pig, pork' [nominative and genitive] from *sika : *siɣan. A similar process explains the /f/ pronunciation for some English words with "gh", such as "tough"),
 and otherwise it was lost entirely.

Modern Finnish punctuation, along with that of Swedish, uses the colon to separate the stem of a word and its grammatical ending in some cases, for example after acronyms, as in  'in the EU'. (This contrasts with some other alphabetic writing systems, which would use other symbols, such as e.g. apostrophe, hyphen.) Since suffixes play a prominent role in the language, this use of the colon is quite common.

Modernization
In the 19th century Johan Vilhelm Snellman and others began to stress the need to improve the status of Finnish. Ever since the days of Mikael Agricola, written Finnish had been used almost exclusively in religious contexts, but now Snellman's Hegelian nationalistic ideas of Finnish as a fully-fledged national language gained considerable support. Concerted efforts were made to improve the status of the language and to modernize it, and by the end of the century Finnish had become a language of administration, journalism, literature, and science in Finland, along with Swedish.

In 1853 Daniel Europaeus published the first Swedish-Finnish dictionary, and between 1866 and 1880 Elias Lönnrot compiled the first Finnish-Swedish dictionary. In the same period, Antero Warelius conducted ethnographic research and, among other topics, he documented  the geographic distribution of the Finnish dialects.

The most important contributions to improving the status of Finnish were made by Elias Lönnrot. His impact on the development of modern vocabulary in Finnish was particularly significant. In addition to compiling the Kalevala, he acted as an arbiter in disputes about the development of standard Finnish between the proponents of western and eastern dialects, ensuring that the western dialects preferred by Agricola retained their preeminent role, while many originally dialect words from Eastern Finland were introduced to the standard language, thus enriching it considerably. The first novel written in Finnish (and by a Finnish speaker) was Seven Brothers, published by Aleksis Kivi in 1870.

Future
The Finnish language has been changing in certain ways after World War II, as observed in the spreading of certain dialectal features, for example the spread of the Western dialectal variant for the written cluster ts ( : / ['forest : forest's'] instead of) and the Eastern disappearance of d ( 'I know' instead of ) and the simultaneous preference to abandon the more visible dialectal features. Some scientists have also reported the low front vowel [æ] (orthographic ⟨ä⟩) moving toward [ɑ] (orthographic ⟨a⟩), theorising that the Finnish speakers would start to pronounce  even more distantly from the changing  in order to preserve the system of vowel harmony.

Dialects

The dialects of Finnish are divided into two distinct groups, Western and Eastern. The dialects are largely mutually intelligible and are distinguished from each other by changes in vowels, diphthongs and rhythm, as well as in preferred grammatical constructions. For the most part, the dialects operate on the same phonology and grammar. There are only marginal examples of sounds or grammatical constructions specific to some dialect and not found in standard Finnish. Two examples are the voiced dental fricative found in the Rauma dialect, and the Eastern exessive case.

The classification of closely related dialects spoken outside Finland is a politically sensitive issue that has been controversial since Finland's independence in 1917. This concerns specifically the Karelian language in Russia and Meänkieli in Sweden, the speakers of which are often considered oppressed minorities. Karelian is different enough from standard Finnish to have its own orthography. Meänkieli is a northern dialect almost entirely intelligible to speakers of any other Finnish dialect, which achieved its status as an official minority language in Sweden for historical and political reasons, although Finnish is an official minority language in Sweden, too. In 1980, many texts, books and the Bible were translated into Meänkieli and it has been developing more into its own language.

Western dialects

The Southwest Finnish dialects are spoken in Southwest Finland and Satakunta. Their typical feature is abbreviation of word-final vowels, and in many respects they resemble Estonian. The Tavastian dialects are spoken in Tavastia. The South Ostrobothnian dialects are spoken in Southern Ostrobothnia. Their most notable feature is the pronunciation of "d" as a tapped or even fully trilled . The Central and North Ostrobothnian dialects are spoken in Central and Northern Ostrobothnia. The Lappish dialects are spoken in Lapland. The dialects spoken in the western parts of Lapland are recognizable by retention of old "h" sounds in positions where they have disappeared from other dialects.

One form of speech related to Northern dialects, Meänkieli, which is spoken on the Swedish side of the border, is taught in some Swedish schools as a distinct standardized language. The speakers of Meänkieli became politically separated from the other Finns when Finland was annexed to Russia in 1809. The categorization of Meänkieli as a separate language is controversial among some Finns, who see no linguistic criteria, only political reasons, for treating Meänkieli differently from other dialects of Finnish.

The Kven language is spoken in Finnmark and Troms, in Norway. Its speakers are descendants of Finnish emigrants to the region in the 18th and 19th centuries. Kven is an official minority language in Norway.

Eastern dialects

The Eastern dialects consist of the widespread Savonian dialects spoken in Savo and nearby areas, and the South-Eastern dialects now spoken only in Finnish South Karelia. The South Karelian dialects were previously also spoken on the Karelian Isthmus and in Ingria. The Karelian Isthmus was evacuated during World War II and refugees were resettled all over Finland. Most Ingrian Finns were deported to various interior areas of the Soviet Union.

Palatalization, a common feature of Uralic languages, had been lost in the Finnic branch, but it has been reacquired by most of these languages, including Eastern Finnish, but not Western Finnish. In Finnish orthography, this is denoted with a "j", e.g.   "water", cf. standard  .

The language spoken in those parts of Karelia that have not historically been under Swedish or Finnish rule is usually called the Karelian language, and it is considered to be more distant from standard Finnish than the Eastern dialects. Whether this language of Russian Karelia is a dialect of Finnish or a separate language is sometimes disputed.

Helsinki slang
The first known written account in Helsinki slang is from the 1890 short story Hellaassa by young Santeri Ivalo (words that do not exist in, or deviate from, the standard spoken Finnish of its time are in bold):

Dialect chart of Finnish

 Western dialects
Southwest Finnish dialects
Proper Finnish dialects
 Northern dialect group
 Southern dialect group
Southwest Finnish middle dialects
Pori region dialects
Ala-Satakunta dialects
dialects of Turku highlands
Somero region dialects
Western Uusimaa dialects
Helsinki slang\dialects
Tavastian dialects
Ylä-Satakunta dialects
Heart Tavastian dialects
Southern Tavastian dialects
Southern-Eastern Tavastian dialects
Hollola dialect group
Porvoo dialect group
Iitti dialect group
South Ostrobothnian dialects
Central and North Ostrobothnian dialects
Central Ostrobothnian dialects
North Ostrobothnian dialects
Lappish dialects
Torne dialects ("Meänkieli" in Sweden)
Kemi dialects
Kemijärvi dialects
Gällivare dialects ("Meänkieli" in Sweden)
Finnmark dialects ("Kven language" in Northern Norway)
Eastern dialects
Savonian dialects
North Savonian dialects
South Savonian dialects
Middle dialects of Savonlinna region
East Savonian dialects or North Karelian dialects
Kainuu dialects
Central Finland dialects
Päijänne Tavastia dialects
Keuruu-Evijärvi dialects
Savonian dialects of Värmland (Sweden)
South Karelian dialects
Proper South Karelian dialects
Middle dialects of Lemi region
Dialects of Ingria (in Russia)

Linguistic registers

There are two main registers of Finnish used throughout the country. One is the "standard language", and the other is the "spoken language". The standard language is used in formal situations like political speeches and newscasts. Its written form, the "book language", is used in nearly all written texts, not always excluding even the dialogue of common people in popular prose. The spoken language, on the other hand, is the main variety of Finnish used in popular TV and radio shows and at workplaces, and may be preferred to a dialect in personal communication.

Standardization
Standard Finnish is prescribed by the Language Office of the Research Institute for the Languages of Finland and is the language used in official communication. The Dictionary of Contemporary Finnish ( 1951–61), with 201,000 entries, was a prescriptive dictionary that defined official language. An additional volume for words of foreign origin (30,000 entries) was published in 1991. An updated dictionary, The New Dictionary of Modern Finnish was published in an electronic form in 2004 and in print in 2006. A descriptive grammar (the Large grammar of Finnish, 1,600 pages) was published in 2004. There is also an etymological dictionary, published in 1992–2000, and a handbook of contemporary language. Standard Finnish is used in official texts and is the form of language taught in schools. Its spoken form is used in political speech, newscasts, in courts, and in other formal situations. Nearly all publishing and printed works are in standard Finnish.

Colloquial Finnish

The colloquial language has mostly developed naturally from earlier forms of Finnish, and spread from the main cultural and political centres. The standard language, however, has always been a consciously constructed medium for literature. It preserves grammatical patterns that have mostly vanished from the colloquial varieties and, as its main application is writing, it features complex syntactic patterns that are not easy to handle when used in speech. The colloquial language develops significantly faster, and the grammatical and phonological changes also include the most common pronouns and suffixes, which amount to frequent but modest differences. Some sound changes have been left out of the formal language. For example, irregular verbs have developed in the spoken language as a result of the elision of sonorants in some verbs of the Type III class (with subsequent vowel assimilation), but only when the second syllable of the word is short. The result is that some forms in the spoken language are shortened, e.g.  →  ('I come'), while others remain identical to the standard language  'he comes', never *). However, the longer forms such as  can be used in spoken language in other forms as well.

The literary language certainly still exerts a considerable influence upon the spoken word, because illiteracy is nonexistent and many Finns are avid readers. In fact, it is still not entirely uncommon to meet people who "talk book-ish"; it may have connotations of pedantry, exaggeration, moderation, weaseling or sarcasm (somewhat like heavy use of Latinate words in English, or more old-fashioned or 'pedantic' constructions: compare the difference between saying "There's no children I'll leave it to" and "There are no children to whom I shall leave it"). More common is the intrusion of typically literary constructions into a colloquial discourse, as a kind of quote from written Finnish. It is quite common to hear book-like and polished speech on radio or TV, and the constant exposure to such language tends to lead to the adoption of such constructions even in everyday language.

It has been reinforced by the spelling "ts" for the dental fricative , used earlier in some western dialects. The spelling and the pronunciation this encourages however approximate the original pronunciation, still reflected in e.g. Karelian . It is notable that neither of these forms are identifiable as, or originate from, a specific dialect.

The orthography of informal language follows that of the formal. However, in signalling the former in writing, syncope and sandhi – especially internal – may occasionally amongst other characteristics be transcribed, e.g. . This never occurs in the standard variety.

Examples

{| class="wikitable"
|-
||formal language
||colloquial language
||meaning
|notes
|-
||

||

||"he/she goes"
"they go"

loss of a number contrast on verbs in the 3rd person ( is 3rd person singular in the formal language)
|-
|
|
|"I, my, ..." 
|various alternative, usually shorter, forms of 1st and 2nd person pronouns
|-
||

||

||"I'm coming" or "I will come"
"I am" or "I will be" 
|elision of sonorants before short vowels in certain Type III verbs along with vowel assimilation,
and no pro-drop (i.e., personal pronouns are usually mandatory in the colloquial language)
|-
||

||

||"do you (pl.) have?"
"don't you (pl.) have (it)?"
|vowel apocope and common use of the clitic  in interrogatives
(compare  to standard Estonian confirmatory interrogative )
|-
||
||
||"we don't say" or "we won't say"
|the passive voice is used in place of the first person plural
|-
||
||
||"my book" 
|lack of possessive clitics on nouns
|-
||

||

||"I don't know" 
"to eat"
(compare  to standard Estonian  or dialectal forms  or )
|-
||
||
||"sixty-five" 
|abbreviated forms of numerals
|-
||

||

||"red"
"to time"
|unstressed diphthongs ending in  become short vowels, and apocope of phrase-final 
|-
||
||
||"probably will fix"
|absence of the potential mood, use of  'probably' instead
|}

Note that there are noticeable differences between dialects. Also note that here the formal language does not mean a language spoken in formal occasions but the standard language which exists practically only in written form.

Phonology

Segmental phonology 
The phoneme inventory of Finnish is moderately small, with a great number of vocalic segments and a restricted set of consonant types, both of which can be long or short.

Vocalic segments 
Finnish monophthongs show eight vowel qualities that contrast in duration, thus 16 vowel phonemes in total. Vowel allophony is quite restricted. Vowel phonemes are always contrastive in word-initial syllables; for non-initial syllable, see morphophonology below. Long and short vowels are shown below.

The usual analysis is that Finnish has long and short vowels and consonants as distinct phonemes. However, long vowels may be analyzed as a vowel followed by a chroneme, or also, that sequences of identical vowels are pronounced as "diphthongs". The quality of long vowels mostly overlaps with the quality of short vowels, with the exception of u, which is centralized with respect to uu; long vowels do not morph into diphthongs. There are eighteen phonemic diphthongs; like vowels, diphthongs do not have significant allophony.

Consonants 
Finnish has a consonant inventory of small to moderate size, where voicing is mostly not distinctive, and fricatives are scarce. Finnish has relatively few non-coronal consonants. Consonants are as follows, where consonants in parentheses are found either only in a few recent loans or are allophones of other phonemes.

Almost all consonants have phonemic short and long (geminated) forms, although length is only contrastive in consonants word-medially.

Consonant clusters are mostly absent in native Finnish words, except for a small set of two-consonant sequences in syllable codas, e.g. However, because of a number of recently adopted loanwords that have them, e.g.  from Swedish , meaning 'ostrich', clusters have been integrated to the modern language to different degrees.

Finnish is somewhat divergent from other Uralic languages in two respects: it has lost most fricatives, as well as losing the distinction between  palatalized and non-palatalized consonants. The alphabet includes "z", usually pronounced [ts]. While standard Finnish has lost palatalization, which is characteristic of Uralic languages, the Eastern dialects and the Karelian language have redeveloped or retained it.

/h/ can allophonically vary between [ç~x~h~ɦ] i.e. vihko ['ʋiçko̞], kahvi ['kɑxʋi], raha ['rɑɦɑ].

A feature of Finnic phonology is the development of labial and rounded vowels in non-initial syllables, as in the word . Proto-Uralic had only "a" and "i" and their vowel harmonic allophones in non-initial syllables; modern Finnish allows other vowels in non-initial syllables, although they are uncommon compared to "a", "ä" and "i".

Prosody 
Characteristic features of Finnish (common to some other Uralic languages) are vowel harmony and an agglutinative morphology; owing to the extensive use of the latter, words can be quite long.

The main stress is always on the first syllable, and is in average speech articulated by adding approximately 100 ms more length to the stressed vowel. Stress does not cause any measurable modifications in vowel quality (very much unlike English). However, stress is not strong and words appear evenly stressed. In some cases, stress is so weak that the highest points of volume, pitch and other indicators of "articulation intensity" are not on the first syllable, although native speakers recognize the first syllable as being stressed.

Morphophonology

Finnish has several morphophonological processes that require modification of the forms of words for daily speech. The most important processes are vowel harmony and consonant gradation.

Vowel harmony is a redundancy feature, which means that the feature [±back] is uniform within a word, and so it is necessary to interpret it only once for a given word. It is meaning-distinguishing in the initial syllable, and suffixes follow; so, if the listener hears [±back] in any part of the word, they can derive [±back] for the initial syllable. For example, from the stem  ('product') one derives  ('into his product'), where the final vowel becomes the back vowel "a" (rather than the front vowel "ä") because the initial syllable contains the back vowels "uo". This is especially notable because vowels "a" and "ä" are different, meaning-distinguishing phonemes, not interchangeable or allophonic. Finnish front vowels are not umlauts, though the graphemes ⟨ä⟩ and ⟨ö⟩ feature dieresis.

Consonant gradation is a partly nonproductive lenition process for P, T and K in inherited vocabulary, with the oblique stem "weakened" from the nominative stem, or vice versa. For example,  'precise' has the oblique stem , as in  'of the precise'. There is also another gradation pattern, which is older, and causes simple elision of T and K in suffixes. However, it is very common since it is found in the partitive case marker: if V is a single vowel, V+ → Va, e.g. * → .

Grammar

Finnish is a synthetic language that employs extensive agglutination of affixes to verbs, nouns, adjectives and numerals. However, Finnish is not generally considered polysynthetic, its morpheme-to-word ratio being somewhat lower than a prototypical polysynthetic language (e.g., Yup'ik).

The morphosyntactic alignment of Finnish is nominative–accusative, but there are two object cases: accusative and partitive. The contrast between accusative and partitive object cases is one of telicity, where the accusative case denotes actions completed as intended ( 'I shot the/an elk (dead)'), and the partitive case denotes incomplete actions ( 'I shot (at) the/an elk'). Often telicity is confused with perfectivity, but these are distinct notions. Finnish in fact has a periphrastic perfective aspect, which in addition to the two inflectional tenses (past and present), yield a Germanic-like system consisting of four tense-aspect combinations: simple present, simple past, perfect (present + perfective aspect) and pluperfect (past + perfective aspect). No morphological future tense is needed; context and the telicity contrast in object grammatical case serve to disambiguate present events from future events. For example,  'I eat a fish (completely)' must denote a future event, since there is no way to completely eat a fish at the current moment (the moment the eating is complete, the simple past tense or the perfect must be used). By contrast,  'I eat a fish (not yet complete)' denotes a present event by indicating ongoing action.

Finnish has three grammatical persons; finite verbs agree with subject nouns in person and number by way of suffixes. Non-finite verb forms bear the infinitive suffix  (often lenited to  due to consonant gradation). There is a so-called "passive voice" (sometimes called impersonal or indefinite) which differs from a true passive in various respects.  Transitivity is distinguished in the derivational morphology of verbs, e.g.  'to solve something' vs.  'to solve by itself'. There are also several frequentative and momentane affixes which form new verbs derivationally.

Nouns may be suffixed with the markers for the aforementioned accusative case and partitive case, the genitive case, eight different locatives, and a few other oblique cases. The case affix must be added not only to the head noun, but also to its modifiers; e.g. , literally 'big-in house-in'. Possession is marked with possessive suffixes; these suffixes appear on nouns and pronouns alike (Finnish possessive pronouns are thus not suppletive like English her).

Lexicon

Finnish has a smaller core vocabulary than, for example, English, and uses derivational suffixes to a greater extent. As an example, take the word  "a book", from which one can form derivatives  'a letter' (of the alphabet),  'a piece of correspondence, a letter',  'a library',  'an author',  'literature',  'to write',  'a writer',  'a scribe, a clerk',  'in written form',  'to write down, register, record',  'a font', and many others.

Here are some of the more common such suffixes. Which of each pair is used depends on the word being suffixed in accordance with the rules of vowel harmony.

Verbal derivational suffixes are extremely diverse; several frequentatives and momentanes differentiating causative, volitional-unpredictable and anticausative are found, often combined with each other, often denoting indirection. For example,  'to jump',  'to be jumping',  'to be jumping wantonly',  'to make someone jump once',  'to make someone jump repeatedly' (or 'to boss someone around'),  'to make someone to cause a third person to jump repeatedly',  'to, without aim, make someone jump repeatedly',  'to jump suddenly' (in anticausative meaning),  'to jump around repeatedly',  'to be jumping repeatedly and wantonly'. Caritives are also used in such examples as  'without jumping' and  'without jumping around'.
 'to sit down' ( 'I sit down')
 'to sit down for a while'
 'I'll sit down for a while'
 'I would sit down for a while'
 'should I sit down for a while?'
 'I wonder if I should sit down for a while'
 'I wonder if I should sit down for a while after all'

Borrowing
Over the course of many centuries, the Finnish language has borrowed many words from a wide variety of languages, most from neighbouring Indo-European languages. Owing to the different grammatical, phonological and phonotactic structure of the Finnish language, loanwords from Indo-European have been assimilated.

While early borrowings, possibly even into Proto-Uralic, from very early Indo-European languages can be found, Finnic languages, including Finnish, have borrowed in particular from Baltic and Germanic languages, and to a lesser extent from Slavic and Indo-Iranian languages (all of which are subgroupings of Indo-European). Furthermore, a certain group of very basic and neutral words exists in Finnish and other Finnic languages that are absent from other Uralic languages, but without a recognizable etymology from any known language. These words are usually regarded as the last remnant of the Paleo-European language spoken in Fennoscandia before the arrival of the proto-Finnic language. Words included in this group are e.g.

Also some place names, like Päijänne and Imatra, are probably from before the proto-Finnic era.

Often quoted loan examples are  'king' and  'sovereign prince, high ranking nobleman' from Germanic  and —they display a remarkable tendency towards phonological conservation within the language. Another example is  'mother' (from Germanic ), which is interesting because borrowing of close-kinship vocabulary is a rare phenomenon. The original Finnish  and  occurs only in restricted contexts. There are other close-kinship words that are loaned from Baltic and Germanic languages ( 'bride',  'dear',  'whore'). Examples of the ancient Iranian loans are  'hammer' from Avestan ,  and  'slave' from arya, airya 'man' (the latter probably via similar circumstances as slave from Slav in many European languages).

More recently, Swedish has been a prolific source of borrowings, and also, the Swedish language acted as a proxy for European words, especially those relating to government. Present-day Finland was a part of Sweden from the 12th century and was ceded to Russia in 1809, becoming an autonomous Grand Duchy. Swedish was retained as the official language and language of the upper class even after this. When Finnish was accepted as an official language, it gained legal equal status with Swedish. During the period of autonomy, Russian did not gain much ground as a language of the people or the government. Nevertheless, quite a few words were subsequently acquired from Russian (especially in older Helsinki slang) but not to the same extent as with Swedish. In all these cases, borrowing has been partly a result of geographical proximity.

Especially words dealing with administrative or modern culture came to Finnish from Swedish, sometimes reflecting the oldest Swedish form of the word ( – , 'law';  – , 'province';  – , 'bishop';  – , 'potato'), and many more survive as informal synonyms in spoken or dialectal Finnish (e.g. , from Swedish , 'girl', usually  in Finnish).

Some Slavic loanwords are old or very old, thus hard to recognize as such, and concern everyday concepts, e.g. 'bean',  'border' and  'priest'. This is mainly believed to be result of trade with Novgorod from the 9th century on and Russian Orthodox missions in the east in the 13th century.

Most recently, and with increasing impact, English has been the source of new loanwords in Finnish. Unlike previous geographical borrowing, the influence of English is largely cultural and reaches Finland by many routes, including international business, music, film and TV (foreign films and programmes, excluding ones intended for a very young audience, are shown subtitled), literature, and the Web – the latter is now probably the most important source of all non-face-to-face exposure to English.

The importance of English as the language of global commerce has led many non-English companies, including Finland's Nokia, to adopt English as their official operating language. Calques from English are also found, e.g. (hard disk), and so are grammatical calques, for example, the replacement of the impersonal with the English-style generic you, e. g. 'you cannot', instead of the proper impersonal  'one cannot' or impersonal third-person singular  'one cannot'. This construct, however, is limited to colloquial language, as it is against the standard grammar.

However, this does not mean that Finnish is threatened by English. Borrowing is normal language evolution, and neologisms are coined actively not only by the government, but also by the media. Moreover, Finnish and English have a considerably different grammar, phonology and phonotactics, discouraging direct borrowing. English loan words in Finnish slang include for example  'PlayStation',  'hot dog', and  'headache', 'headshot' or 'headbutt'. Often these loanwords are distinctly identified as slang or jargon, rarely being used in a negative mood or in formal language. Since English and Finnish grammar, pronunciation and phonetics differ considerably, most loan words are inevitably sooner or later calqued – translated into native Finnish – retaining the semantic meaning.

Neologisms
Some modern terms have been synthesised rather than borrowed, for example:
 'telephone' (from the stem  'talk' + instrument suffix  to make 'an instrument for talking')
 'computer' (literally: 'knowledge machine' or 'data machine')
 'diskette' (from  'disc' + a diminutive )
 'email' (literally: 'electricity mail')
 'bus, coach' (literally: line-car)
 'plastic' (from  'to mould, form or model, e.g. from clay'; compare plastic from Ancient Greek  'mouldable, fit for moulding')

Neologisms are actively generated by the Language Planning Office and the media. They are widely adopted.

Loans to other languages

Orthography

Finnish is written with the Latin alphabet including the distinct characters ä and ö, and also several characters (b, c, f, q, w, x, z, å, š and ž) reserved for words of non-Finnish origin. The Finnish orthography follows the phoneme principle: each phoneme (meaningful sound) of the language corresponds to exactly one grapheme (independent letter), and each grapheme represents almost exactly one phoneme. This enables an easy spelling and facilitates reading and writing acquisition. The rule of thumb for Finnish orthography is write as you read, read as you write. However, morphemes retain their spelling despite sandhi.

Some orthographical notes:
Long vowels and consonants are represented by double occurrences of the relevant graphemes. This causes no confusion, and permits these sounds to be written without having to nearly double the size of the alphabet to accommodate separate graphemes for long sounds.
The grapheme h is sounded slightly harder when placed before a consonant (initially breathy voiced, then voiceless) than before a vowel.
Some consonants (v, j, d) and all consonant clusters do not have distinctive length, and consequently their allophonic variation is typically not specified in spelling; e.g.   ('I limit') vs.   ('I haul').
Pre-1900s texts and personal names use w for v. Both correspond to the same phoneme, the labiodental approximant , a v without the fricative ("hissing") quality of the English v.
The letters ä  and ö , although written with diaereses, do not represent phonological umlauts (as in German, for example), and they are considered independent graphemes; the letter shapes have been copied from Swedish. An appropriate parallel from the Latin alphabet are the characters C and G (uppercase), which historically have a closer kinship than many other characters (G is a derivation of C) but are considered distinct letters, and changing one for the other will change meanings.

Although Finnish is almost completely written as it is spoken, there are a few differences:
 The n in the sequence nk is pronounced as a velar nasal , as in English. When not followed by k,  is written ng. The fact that two spellings correspond to this one sound (putting aside the difference in length) can be seen as an exception to the general one-to-one correspondence between sounds and letters.
 The  after the letter i is very weak or there is no  at all, but in writing it is used; for example: .

When the appropriate characters are not available, the graphemes ä and ö are usually converted to a and o, respectively. This is common in e-mail addresses and other electronic media where there may be no support for characters outside the basic ASCII character set. Writing them as ae and oe, following German usage, is rarer and usually considered incorrect, but formally used in passports and equivalent situations. Both conversion rules have minimal pairs which would no longer be distinguished from each other.

For technical reasons or convenience, the graphemes sh and zh are often used in quickly or less carefully written texts instead of š and ž. This is a deviation from the phonetic principle, and as such is liable to cause confusion, but the damage is minimal as the transcribed words are foreign in any case. Finnish does not use the sounds z, š or ž, but for the sake of exactitude, they can be included in spelling. (The recommendation cites the Russian opera  as an example.) Many speakers pronounce all of them s, or distinguish only between s and š, because Finnish has no voiced sibilants.

The language may be identified by its distinctive lack of the letters b, c, f, q, w, x, z and å.

Language examples
Article 1 of the Universal Declaration of Human Rights:

'All human beings are born free and equal in dignity and rights. They are endowed with reason and conscience and should act towards one another in a spirit of brotherhood."
Excerpt from Väinö Linna's  (The Unknown Soldier); these words were also inscribed in the 20 mark note.

"The sun smiled down on them. It wasn't angry – no, not by any means. Maybe it even felt some sort of sympathy for them. Rather dear, those boys."
(translation from Liesl Yamaguchi's 2015 "Unknown Soldiers")

Basic greetings and phrases

Phonaesthetics and influences
Professor J. R. R. Tolkien, although better known as an author, had a keen interest in languages from a young age, and became a professional philologist, becoming Professor of Anglo-Saxon at Oxford University. He described his first encounter with Finnish was:
"like discovering a complete wine-cellar filled with bottles of an amazing wine of a kind and flavour never tasted before. It quite intoxicated me..."
Aspects of Finnish, particularly its sound, were a strong influence on Quenya, one of the languages constructed by Tolkien spoken by the Elves. Within his fantasy writings set in the world of Middle-earth, Quenya is a highly revered language and is to his world as Latin is to modern Europe; he often referred to it as "elf-Latin". However, Quenya lacks consonant gradation and vowel harmony – two remarkable aspects of Finnish grammar.

See also

 Hungarian language
 Finland's language strife
 Finnish cultural and academic institutes
 Finnish name
 Finnish numerals
 Finnish profanity
 Sisu
 Swedish-speaking Finns

References

Further reading

External links
 Collection of Finnish bilingual dictionaries
 FSI Finnish Language Course (Public Domain)
 Finnish phrases for beginners (Public Domain)

 
Agglutinative languages
Finnic languages
Languages of Estonia
Languages of Finland
Languages of Norway
Languages of Russia
Languages of Sweden
Vowel-harmony languages
Subject–verb–object languages